Latin civilisation may refer to:

 Latins (Italic tribe)
 Ancient Rome
 Roman Empire
 The Legacy of the Roman Empire
 Latin America
 Romance-speaking world
 Western culture, which was influenced by the Roman Empire
 The sphere of influence of the Roman Catholic Church